Nicolaas Scholtz and Tucker Vorster were the defending champions but chose not to defend their title.

Jonathan Erlich and Neal Skupski won the title after defeating Alex Bolt and Jordan Thompson 6–3, 2–6, [10–8] in the final.

Seeds

Draw

References
 Main Draw
 Qualifying Draw

Nordic Naturals Challenger - Doubles
2017 Doubles